Eugenia Cauduro (born Eugenia Cauduro Rodríguez on December 20, 1968, in Mexico City, Distrito Federal) is a Mexican actress and former model.

Life
Eugenia Cauduro is the daughter of Ernesto Cauduro Gemoets and Silvia Rodríguez Porras, and the sister of Adriana Cauduro. Eugenia participated in ballet as a child. Her mother had been a ballerina and her maternal grandfather, Dagoberto Rodriguez, had been a well-known Mexican actor. Eugenia's uncle, Rafael Cauduro, is a painter who is recognized internationally.  Ever since she was a small child, Eugenia studied ballet and jazz.  She began modeling at the age of 15 and later studied acting in Televisa's Centro de Educación Artística. In 1988, she was chosen to represent Mexico in a calendar from Japan Air Lines.  

In 1990, she represented Mexico in an international beauty pageant in Mexico and was second place in a group of thirty participants from many countries.  From 1992 to 1995, she represented the image of Televisa in a series of appearances that showcased many of Mexico's marvels.  While being the image of Televisa, she studied acting with actor/director Sergio Jimenez and the actress Adriana Barrasa.  From there, she continued studying with Patricia Reyes Espindola.  After acting in plays, Eugenia Cauduro made her small-screen debut in the telenovela Alguna vez tendremos alas, in which she played Magdalena Arredón. She studied industrial design in the National Autonomous University of Mexico (UNAM).

Since that time, Eugenia has become one of the most recognizable actresses in Mexico.  Eugenia's recent work includes a telenovela, Quererlo Todo, which has been awaiting release in 2020.

Filmography

References

External links
 
 Eugenia Cauduro Fansite

1967 births
Living people
Mexican stage actresses
Mexican telenovela actresses
Mexican television actresses
Mexican female models
Mexican people of Belgian descent
Mexican people of Italian descent
Actresses from Mexico City
20th-century Mexican actresses
21st-century Mexican actresses
National Autonomous University of Mexico alumni
People from Mexico City